Mathías Corujo Díaz (born 8 May 1986) is a Uruguayan former footballer who last played for Club Sol de América. He mostly played as right back, but also could be deployed as a midfielder.

Career
On 30 December 2019 it was confirmed, that Corujo had joined Paraguayan club Club Sol de América for the 2020 season on a free transfer, having been without club since August 2019.

International goals
As of match played 13 June 2016. Uruguay score listed first, score column indicates score after each Corujo goal.

References

External links
 

1986 births
Living people
Uruguayan footballers
Uruguayan expatriate footballers
Uruguay international footballers
Montevideo Wanderers F.C. players
Peñarol players
Cerro Porteño players
Universidad de Chile footballers
San Lorenzo de Almagro footballers
Club Sol de América footballers
Uruguayan Primera División players
Paraguayan Primera División players
Chilean Primera División players
Argentine Primera División players
2015 Copa América players
Copa América Centenario players
People from Canelones Department
Association football fullbacks
Association football midfielders
Expatriate footballers in Chile
Expatriate footballers in Paraguay
Expatriate footballers in Argentina
Uruguayan expatriate sportspeople in Chile
Uruguayan expatriate sportspeople in Paraguay
Uruguayan expatriate sportspeople in Argentina